KT5720 is a kinase inhibitor with specificity towards protein kinase A. It is a semi-synthetic derivative of K252a and analog of staurosporine.

References

Indole alkaloids
Protein kinase inhibitors
Indolocarbazoles